Greta Bradman (born 1979 or 1982) is an Australian operatic soprano.

Career
Richard Bonynge selected Bradman to sing the title role in a concert performance of Handel's Rodelinda in 2014.

Bradman was the subject of two episodes of the ABC TV program Australian Story in 2015. Later that year, she joined David Hobson, Teddy Tahu Rhodes, and Lisa McCune for a concert tour of the five Australian mainland state capitals. Bradman's name was added as a critics' choice to the Walk of Fame at the Adelaide Festival Centre.

After guest presenting in 2016, in 2017 Bradman joined ABC Classic FM as a presenter.

2017 saw Bradman's only performance in a fully staged opera as Mimì in Gale Edwards' production of La bohème for Opera Australia in the Sydney Opera House. Bradman – with vocalist Luke Harrison, guitarist Karin Schaupp and the Queensland Ballet – performed "Eliza Aria" from Elena Kats-Chernin's Wild Swans in the 2018 Commonwealth Games closing ceremony.

Bradman sang "Advance Australia Fair" at the state memorial service of Shane Warne in March 2022 at the MCG.

Personal life
Bradman was born in Adelaide as Greta Bradsen. She is a granddaughter of cricketer Sir Donald Bradman, at whose funeral she sang in 2001 and who inspired her singing. Her father John had changed his name from Bradman to Bradsen to escape the inevitable connection with his father's celebrity, but the family changed back to Bradman when Greta was a teenager. Shortly after her grandfather's death, she struggled with self harm issues.

Her husband is Didier Elzinga, the co-founder and CEO of software company Culture Amp. They have two sons.

Bradman has a masters degree in Psychology and is a registered psychologist.

Discography

Albums

Awards and nominations

ARIA Music Awards
The ARIA Music Awards are presented annually from 1987 by the Australian Recording Industry Association (ARIA).

! 
|-
| 2010
| Forest of Dreams: Classical Lullabies to Get Lost In
| Best Children's Album
| 
| 
|-
| 2018
| Home (with Adelaide Symphony Orchestra, Adelaide Chamber Singers & Luke Dollman)
| Best Classical Album
| 
|

References

External links
 "In familial territory" by Steve Dow, The Sydney Morning Herald, 15 October 2011</ref>

, "Pie Jesu" from Andrew Lloyd Webber's Requiem

Living people
Year of birth uncertain
1970s births
1990s births
Musicians from Adelaide
Australian operatic sopranos
21st-century Australian women opera singers